Vatica pallida is a species of plant in the family Dipterocarpaceae. It is a tree endemic to Peninsular Malaysia. It is an endangered species threatened by habitat loss.

References

pallida
Endemic flora of Peninsular Malaysia
Trees of Peninsular Malaysia
Endangered plants
Taxonomy articles created by Polbot